The Barcelona World Race is a non-stop, round-the-world yacht  race for crews of two, sailed on Open 60 IMOCA monohull boats. Following the Clipper route, it starts and finishes in Barcelona, and is organised by the Barcelona Ocean Sailing Foundation (FNOB).  

The inaugural race, contested in 2007–08 by nine boats, was won by Jean-Pierre Dick and Damian Foxall on the boat Paprec-Virbac 2 in a time of 92 days.  

The second edition of the race started on 31 December 2010 and was won by Jean-Pierre Dick and Loïck Peyron on Virbac-Paprec 3 in a time of 93 days 22 hours 20 minutes 36 seconds. 

The third edition of the race started with eight boats on 31 December 2014 and was won by Bernard Stamm and Jean Le Cam on Cheminées Poujoulat in a time of 84 days 5 hours 50 minutes 25 seconds. Guillermo Altadill and José Muñoz finished second on Neutrogena.

The fourth edition of the race was intended to start from Barcelona on 12 January 2019, but on 29 March 2018 the organisers announced that the race had been suspended, due to political instability, citing political and institutional difficulties in Spain. The ongoing crisis in Catalonia had prevented FNOB from being able to make the necessary guarantees to sponsors. They hope to reorganise the race for 2022-2023.

1st Edition 2007-2008

Results

2nd Edition 2010-2011

Results

3rd Edition 2014-2015

Results

References

External links

 Official Race Website

Round-the-world sailing competitions
Yachting races
Sailing competitions in Spain